Dato' K. Sivalingam (Tamil: கே. சிவலிங்கம்) (January 1948 - 4 April 2007) was a Malaysian politician of Indian descent. He was aligned to the Malaysian Indian Congress (MIC), a major component party of the incumbent Barisan Nasional (BN) coalition, and was the Selangor state MIC deputy chairman.

Political career
Prior to entering politics, Sivalingam was involved in journalism. He joined the MIC in 1968 at the age of 20, and by 1986 he was elected as a senator by the Selangor state legislative assembly. Sivalingam contested the Selangor state constituency of Seri Cahaya in the 1990 general election as a rookie candidate and won. In the 1995 general election, he contested the Ijok state constituency and won comfortably, beating a Democratic Action Party (DAP) candidate. In 1997, he was appointed as a member of the Selangor state executive council, a position he held up to his death. He retained the Ijok seat in the 1999 and 2004 general elections.

Death
On April 4, 2007, en route a leisure trip to southern India with his daughter and son-in-law, Sivalingam died from a heart attack in Chennai, India, upon arrival at the Chennai International Airport from Kuala Lumpur. His death prompted the 2007 Ijok by-election to elect a successor representative for his former constituency.

Election results

Notes and references

Malaysian politicians of Indian descent
Malaysian politicians of Tamil descent
Malaysian journalists
1940s births
2007 deaths
Malaysian Indian Congress politicians
Members of the Dewan Negara
Members of the Selangor State Legislative Assembly
Selangor state executive councillors
20th-century journalists